Bharat Shah (October 14th, 1945-January 18th, 2016) is a Kenyan former first-class cricketer.

Shah made one appearance in first-class cricket for Kenya against the touring Pakistan Starlets at Nairobi in 1986. Opening the batting twice in the match alongside Daniel Macdonald, he was dismissed for 6 runs in the Kenyan first innings by Mohsin Kamal, while in their second innings he narrowly missed out on a century, making 97 runs before being dismissed by Nadeem Ghauri. He also represented Kenya in the 1990 ICC Trophy in the Netherlands, making five appearances in the tournament.

References

External links

Living people
Kenyan cricketers
Year of birth missing (living people)